KDSM-TV (channel 17) is a television station in Des Moines, Iowa, United States, affiliated with the Fox network. The station is owned by Sinclair Broadcast Group, and has studios on Fleur Drive in Des Moines; its transmitter is located in Alleman, Iowa.

History

Prior history of UHF channel 17 in Des Moines
Central Iowa's second television station, KGTV, signed-on in 1953 airing an analog signal on UHF channel 17.  At the time, all four networks were shoehorned onto WOI-TV. KGTV was plagued by financial problems from the start. The Des Moines market is fairly large geographically, and at the time UHF signals didn't travel very far across long distances. It did not help that very few television sets had UHF capability at the time. As a result, while KGTV should have logically taken the NBC affiliation, that network opted to keep a secondary affiliation with WOI-TV.

The death knell for the station sounded a few months after it went on the air, when Palmer Communications, owner of WHO-AM-FM, won a construction permit for WHO-TV (channel 13). As WHO had been an NBC radio affiliate for almost 30 years, it was a foregone conclusion that WHO-TV would take the NBC affiliation. Channel 17 went dark April 15, 1955.  The KGTV calls now reside on the ABC affiliate in San Diego, California.

Early history
Analog UHF channel 17 remained silent until 3:27 p.m. on March 7, 1983, when independent station KCBR (known as "The Great Entertainer") signed-on for "testing" purposes. Normal operations began on March 14, 1983. It was Iowa's first independent station, as well as the first new commercial station in Central Iowa since KRNT-TV (now KCCI) signed-on 28 years earlier. The call letters were picked from the first names of the three original owners: Carl Goldsberry, Bill Trout, and Ray Gazzo. Goldsberry was a Northwestern Bell yellow pages sales representative, while Trout and Gazzo were partners in the Des Moines law firm of Coppola Trout Taha & Gazzo. Trout and Gazzo's law partner, Joe Coppola, bought a stake in the station when it needed a cash infusion.

The station was sold to Richard L. Duchossois, a Chicago businessman, in 1986. Duchossois changed the station's call letters to 'KDSM-TV ("KDSM" is the IATA airport code for Des Moines International Airport) on January 17 and later that year, it became one of the charter affiliates of Fox. In 1987, KDSM won the rights to televise University of Iowa basketball games, coaches shows and football replays. The station carried Iowa Hawkeyes basketball along with Big Ten Conference football and basketball until those games left syndication due to the creation of the Big Ten Network in 2007; in 2019 it began to carry select games involving the team again, as Fox acquired tier 1 rights to the Big Ten Conference. KDSM came under the ownership of River City Broadcasting in 1991. In 1996, River City merged with the station's current owner, Sinclair Broadcast Group.

Programming
Syndicated programming on KDSM includes The Big Bang Theory, Two and a Half Men, The People's Court, and Judge Mathis among others. From January 2012 to 2015, KDSM aired the nationally syndicated morning show The Daily Buzz on weekdays from 6 until 8 (tape-delayed by an hour). Until the 2019 season, KDSM served as the Central Iowa affiliate for Chicago Cubs games carried by ABC owned-and-operated station WLS-TV.

Newscasts

On March 4, 2001, KDSM debuted a nightly half-hour prime time newscast produced by sister station CBS affiliate KGAN-TV in Cedar Rapids, titled Fox 17 News at 9, originating from KGAN's studios on Old Marion Road Northeast in Cedar Rapids and featured the majority of that station's on-air personnel. Due to a lack of news personnel locally based out of KDSM's facility, regionalized news coverage and statewide weather forecasts were provided during the show. In 2002, for the convenience of Eastern Iowa viewers, the program was added through a simulcast to fellow Fox affiliate and sister outlet KFXA (which is housed with KGAN). The production was subsequently renamed Fox News at 9 and its format remained the same for the most part although Eastern Iowa coverage from KGAN reporters were added.

On September 2, 2008, NBC affiliate WHO-DT (then owned by Local TV; then formerly acquired outright by Tribune Broadcasting, now owned by Nexstar Media Group) entered into a news share agreement with KDSM. The big three station then began producing a Des Moines-based prime time newscast known as Channel 13 News at Nine on Fox 17. Originating from WHO-DT's primary set at its facilities on Grand Avenue in Downtown Des Moines (with separate duratrans indicating the Fox show), this program currently airs for an hour on weeknights and thirty minutes on weekends. Although KDSM shares most of WHO-DT's on-air team, this outlet maintains a separate news anchor on weeknights. Unlike other outsourced news arrangements at Sinclair-owned television stations, this outlet uses the same music package and graphics scheme as seen on the NBC affiliate.

On April 22, 2009, WHO-DT became the second station in Des Moines to air all in-studio news in 16:9 enhanced definition widescreen. Although not truly high definition, broadcasts matched the aspect ratio of HD television screens. The KDSM shows were not included in this specific change. On May 19, 2010, WHO-DT upgraded further to full high definition local newscasts. However, the prime time broadcasts on this channel were not initially included due to KDSM's lack of an HD master control facility at its separate studios. As a result, the newscasts were still seen in pillarboxed 4:3 standard definition. At some point in December 2010, this station finally underwent a master control upgrade and began airing local programming in HD including Channel 13 News at Nine on Fox 17.

Technical information

Subchannels
The station's digital signal is multiplexed:

From mid-2006 until the end of that year, KDSM 17.2 carried The Tube Music Network; after that was dropped due to conflicts between Sinclair and the network, 17.2 ran a simulcast of 17.1 (The Tube was eventually shut down on October 1, 2007). On October 4, 2010, 17.2 began carrying a similar music video network called TheCoolTV and continued to carry that network until the afternoon of August 31, 2012, when Sinclair dropped that network on all of its stations that carried the network nationwide; from then on until July 1, 2014, when 17.2 was reactivated as an affiliate of the classic movie network GetTV, 17.2 remained vacant. GetTV was replaced by Comet on October 31, 2015. Through a separate deal between Sinclair and The Country Network (now ZUUS Country), KDSM activated 17.3 to begin carrying that network on March 16, 2011, and was replaced with the male-oriented Grit on December 29, 2014. On February 28, 2017, Grit was replaced on 17.3 by the Sinclair owned Charge! network. KDSM added a fourth subchannel on February 13, 2017, affiliated with the Sinclair-owned TBD network.

ATSC 3.0 lighthouse
On March 28, 2023, Sinclair will convert KDSM's spectrum into an ATSC 3.0 lighthouse transmitter for the Des Moines market, carrying the main channels of KCCI, WHO, KDSM and KDIN (Tegna's WOI-DT and KCWI-TV will not participate at this time). KDSM's channels will be disbursed across those stations in the ATSC 1.0 standard, with WHO carrying its main Fox channel.

Analog-to-digital conversion
KDSM-TV shut down its analog signal, over UHF channel 17, on February 17, 2009, the original target date in which full-power television stations in the United States were to transition from analog to digital broadcasts under federal mandate (which was later pushed back to June 12, 2009). The station's digital signal remained on its pre-transition UHF channel 16. Through the use of PSIP, digital television receivers display the station's virtual channel as its former UHF analog channel 17.

References

External links
Official website

Fox network affiliates
Comet (TV network) affiliates
Charge! (TV network) affiliates
TBD (TV network) affiliates
Sinclair Broadcast Group
Television channels and stations established in 1983
1983 establishments in Iowa
Television stations in Des Moines, Iowa